Gehyra membranacruralis, also known as the Port Moresby four-clawed gecko or Port Moresby dtella, is a species of gecko endemic to Papua New Guinea.

References

Gehyra
Reptiles described in 1989